Francesco Disanto (born 10 October 1994) is an Italian professional footballer who plays as a winger for  club Siena.

Career
Born in Florence, Disanto started his career in Serie D club Scandicci.

After a spell in 2013–14 with Arezzo, on 3 July 2014 he signed with Serie C club Pontedera. Disanto made his professional debut on 14 September 2014 against Ancona. He played three years in Pontedera.

In January 2018, he moved to Serie D club Sangiovannese.

In 2019, he joined to Serie D club San Donato Tavarnelle. He played 47 matches in two seasons.

On 10 July 2021, he returned to Serie C, and signed with Siena.

References

External links
 
 

1994 births
Living people
Footballers from Florence
Italian footballers
Association football wingers
Serie C players
Serie D players
Scandicci Calcio players
S.S. Arezzo players
U.S. Città di Pontedera players
A.S.D. Sangiovannese 1927 players
A.C.N. Siena 1904 players